The Centerfold Girls is a 1974 sexploitation thriller film directed by John Peyser. The film is about a sadistic serial killer (Andrew Prine) who targets the centerfold models of popular men's magazines.

Cast

Andrew Prine as Clement Dunne

The First Story
Jaime Lyn Bauer as Jackie (Miss March)
Aldo Ray as Ed Walker
Dennis Olivieri as Tim
Janet Wood as Linda
Teda Bracci as Rita
Tallie Cochrane as Donna
Paula Shaw as Mrs. Walker
John Hart as Sheriff
Jaki Dunn as Nurse
Charlie as Judy (Miss January)

The Second Story
Ray Danton as Perry 
Francine York as Melissa
Jeremy Slate as The Detective
Mike Mazurki as The Caretaker
Jennifer Ashley as Charlie (Miss May)
Kitty Carl as Sandi
Ruthy Ross as Glory
John Denos as Sam
Janus Blythe as Roommate

The Third Story
Tiffany Bolling as Vera Porter (Miss July)
Connie Strickland as Patsy
Anneka Di Lorenzo as Pam
Scott Edmund Lane as Sailor #1
Richard Mansfield as Sailor #2
Dan Seymour as Proprietor
Walden as himself

External links

 Centerfold Girls – at the Troma Entertainment movie database

1974 films
American independent films
Troma Entertainment films
1970s thriller films
1970s English-language films
Films directed by John Peyser
1970s American films